KNX (1070 kHz) is a commercial AM radio station in Los Angeles, California.  It airs an all-news radio format and is owned by Audacy, Inc.  KNX is one of the oldest stations in the United States, having received its first broadcasting license, as KGC, in December 1921, in addition to tracing its history to the September 1920 operations of an earlier amateur station.  The studios and offices—shared with KNX-FM, KCBS-FM, KROQ-FM, KRTH and KTWV—are located on Los Angeles' Miracle Mile.

KNX broadcasts traffic reports on the freeways in the Greater Los Angeles Area every ten minutes on the five's along with weather reports twenty-four hours a day, seven days a week, while other radio stations broadcast traffic reports weekday mornings and evenings.

KNX holds a Class A license as one of the original clear-channel stations allocated under the 1928 General Order 40 band plan. Its full-time 50,000-watt non-directional signal is heard around Southern California. With a good radio, it can be picked up at night throughout much of the Western United States and parts of Mexico and Canada. The station is even received by DXers in Hawaii and across the Pacific Ocean. The transmitter is in Columbia Park in Torrance, near Hawthorne Boulevard (California State Route 107) and 190th Street.

KNX is also authorized to broadcast a digital HD Radio signal.  KNX simulcasts on sister station KNX-FM (97.1 FM); in reflection of this, the station primarily brands as "KNX News 97.1 FM".

History

Origin
Although KNX received its first formal broadcasting station license on December 8, 1921, the station has traditionally dated its founding to September 10, 1920, starting with broadcasts conducted by Fred Christian over his amateur station, 6ADZ. Christian was a former shipboard radio operator, who lived at 5118 Harold Way in Hollywood, California, and was the manager of the Electric Lighting Supply Company at 216 West Third Street, Los Angeles. He later explained that he began the broadcasts in order to provide something to listen to by customers who had constructed receivers from parts purchased at the store. Christian began making broadcasts with a five-watt vacuum-tube transmitter, operating on the standard amateur wavelength of 200 meters (1500 kHz).

KGC
Initially there were no specific standards in the United States for radio stations making transmissions intended for the general public, and numerous stations under various classifications made entertainment broadcasts. However, effective December 1, 1921, the Department of Commerce, regulators of radio at this time, adopted a regulation that formally created a broadcasting station category, and stations were now required to hold a Limited Commercial license authorizing operation on wavelengths of 360 meters (833 kHz) for "entertainment" broadcasts or 485 meters (619 kHz) for "market and weather reports". By the end of 1922 over 500 stations were authorized nationwide.

On December 8, 1921, the Electric Lighting Supply Company was issued a broadcasting station license with the randomly assigned call letters KGC, the second in the county after KQL, authorizing operation on the 360-meter entertainment wavelength. The station's location was listed as Fred Christian's Harold Way home. The shared 360 meter wavelength required timesharing agreements between an increasing number of stations needing exclusive time periods. On May 4 the Los Angeles Times reported that a total of seven local stations were slated to make broadcasts that day, comprising a schedule that ran from noon to 9:00 p.m., with KGC assigned 2:00-2:30 and 7:30-8:00 p.m.

KNX

On May 4, 1922, the Electric Lighting Supply Company was issued a broadcasting license for a station with the randomly assigned call letters of KNX, also on 360 meters, and located at the company's Los Angeles store on West Third Street. This was technically considered to be a second station in addition to KGC, however, after KGC was formally deleted on June 20, 1922, the Department of Commerce concluded that KGC and KNX were functionally the same station, and Federal Communications Commission (FCC) records list KGC's December 8, 1921, initial license date as KNX's "date first licensed".

The new authorization coincided with preparations for a move to the California Theater, broadcasting live music, with Fred Christian continuing as station manager. On June 12, 1922, the Los Angeles Times reported that "After more than two months of preparation, the new broadcast station at the California Theater had its opening program Saturday evening at 9:15, sending out a wavelength of 510 meters [588 kHz]. The station is said to be one of the best in the land, the call letters of which are KNX." KNX's regular broadcast schedule on 360 meters was 9:00 to 10:00 a.m. A week after it commenced operations from the theater, the Times reported that "Numerous reports have come into The Times radio department commending the quality and audibility of material broadcast from KNX, the California Theater radiophone. This station differs from other stations in that it gives its listeners-in the music of the complete orchestra of the California Theater."

KNX's power was raised to 100 watts in early August 1922. In the fall of 1924, Guy Earl, Jr., owner of the Los Angeles Evening Express, arranged for the newspaper's purchase of KNX. The Express made significant upgrades, including increasing the power to 500 watts, and began broadcasting from the Paul G. Hoffman Studebaker building in Hollywood. KNX was one of the last stations to remain on the original 360 meter wavelength, and the newspaper engineered a move to 890 kHz. It remained on this frequency until November 11, 1928, when the station was reassigned to 1050 kHz, under the provisions of a major reallocation resulting from the Federal Radio Commission's (FRC) General Order 40.

In early 1928, Guy Earle sold his share of the Evening Express newspaper and reorganized KNX as the Western Broadcast Company. In 1929, Earle moved the KNX studios to the Paramount Pictures lot, signing a five-year contract, and the station's transmitter power was upgraded from 500 to 5,000 watts. In 1930, KNX became the first station to broadcast the Academy Awards. In 1932, it increased to 10,000 watts. In 1933, the station moved its studios to the former Peerless Motor Company building at 5939 Sunset Boulevard in Hollywood, after being granted permission by the FRC on June 7, 1932, to raise its output to 25,000 watts. The following year, KNX's transmitting power was raised to the nationwide maximum of 50,000 watts, which the station continues presently.
 
CBS purchased KNX in 1936 and began operating it as its West Coast flagship, which ended CBS's eight-year affiliation with KHJ. In 1938, the CBS Columbia Square studios were dedicated for KNX as well as West Coast operations for the entire CBS radio network. That October, the station carried Orson Welles' celebrated version of The War of the Worlds. In March 1941 the station was shifted to 1070 AM as part of the North American Regional Broadcasting Agreement assignments, where it has been ever since.

Theatre legend Jerome Lawrence got his start in radio writing at KNX in the late 1930s. Several legendary performers from the Golden Age of American network radio broadcast from there, including Jack Benny, Bing Crosby, George Burns, Edgar Bergen, Gene Autry and TV situation comedy star Bob Crane, who was KNX's morning host between 1957 and 1965 at the same time he was appearing as a featured supporting player on the ABC television network's The Donna Reed Show. In 1951, KNX gained a television cousin when CBS acquired KTSL and rebranded it as KNXT; it took on the current KCBS-TV callsign in 1984.

KNX was a strong competitor in the Los Angeles market while Crane was a morning personality, but began declining in popularity after he left to star in the CBS television series Hogan's Heroes. Following the example of corporate sister station WCBS in New York City, which had enjoyed renewed success with an all-news format, KNX then became an all-news station in the spring of 1968.  By chance, its first major breaking news coverage was a major worldwide story that happened locally: the assassination of Democratic Presidential candidate Robert F. Kennedy, in the Ambassador Hotel in Los Angeles, on June 5 of that year.

In August 2005, KNX moved out of Columbia Square after operating there for 67 years, and began broadcasting from new studios in the Miracle Mile district on Wilshire Boulevard.

In 2009, KNX adopted the slogan "All news, all the time." It was previously used for 40 years by KFWB, KNX's historic rival in the news radio wars before both became sister stations through the 1995 merger of Westinghouse Electric (KFWB's owner) and CBS. KFWB's format change to news-talk in September 2009 left KNX as the only all-news outlet in the Los Angeles area, which is now emphasized in its alternate slogan, "Southern California's only 24-hour local news & traffic station".

In 2017, KNX won its first ever national Edward R. Murrow award for "Breaking News".  The station was also nominated for two 2017 NAB Marconi awards, Legendary Station of the Year and News/Talk Station of the Year.

On February 2, 2017, CBS agreed to merge CBS Radio with Entercom, then the fourth-largest radio broadcaster in the United States; the sale to be conducted tax-free using a Reverse Morris Trust. While CBS shareholders retained a 72% ownership stake in the combined company, Entercom was the surviving entity, separating KNX from KCBS-TV and KCAL-TV. The merger was approved on November 9, 2017, and was consummated 8 days later. On March 30, 2021, Entercom announced that the company changed its name to Audacy.

On December 6, 2021, KNX announced that it would be adding a FM simulcast on sister station KNOU, replacing the Top 40 format on the station that was established in 2009. KNOU changed their call letters to KNX-FM on December 21, 2021, to reflect the change.

Emergency preparedness
As KNX and competitor station KFI are local primary stations for the Los Angeles Emergency Alert System, they are responsible for activation of the EAS when hazardous weather alerts, disaster area declarations, and child abduction alerts are issued.

Antennas
The station's antenna array features a 494-foot main antenna. 
The original main antenna (circa 1936) was destroyed by vandals on September 14, 1965. An unused 365-foot tower was brought in from KFAC (now KWKW) and was used while the new main antenna was constructed. This antenna was formerly in what is now a residential area to the south of the main antenna.

The 365-foot tower now serves as KNX's emergency antenna. 
It was later relocated when much of the site was dedicated as a park in Torrance; it is now north of the main antenna, within the park.

Only one antenna is active at a time. An experiment in the late 1960s using both antennas in a directional setup during the daytime was abandoned.

Electrical properties 
The 494-foot main antenna is 0.53λ, or 193.5 electrical degrees. It has an efficiency of 400.73 mV/m/kW at 1 km. This is much better than average for a Class A station's main antenna. The FCC's minimum efficiency requirement is 362.10 mV/m/kW at 1 km.

The 365-foot emergency antenna is 0.40λ, or 145.5 electrical degrees. It has an efficiency of about 343 mV/m/kW at 1 km. This is much better than average for a Class A emergency antenna but is inadequate for the main antenna.

Notable former on-air staff
Pete Arbogast News and sports anchor. Longtime broadcaster for USC Trojans Football from 1989 to 1994 and since 2001. 
Bill Ballance
 Bob Barker
 Bob Crane (deceased)
 Michael Fitzmaurice (using the name Mike Kelly)
 Chet Huntley (special events) and news commentary
 Bill Keene legendary traffic reporter best known for nicknames of freeway interchanges. (Deceased)
 Knox Manning (newscaster)
 Gil Stratton longtime sportscaster who worked with KNXT and KNX on and off from 1954 to 1997. 
 Jim Thornton News and traffic anchor. Also the off-screen voice of Wheel of Fortune since 2011. 
 Larry Van Nuys
 Dave Zorn (deceased)
 Dick Helton

Current on-air staff

 Jennifer York - morning traffic reporter
 Craig Figener - political news reporter
 Emily Valdez - general assignment news reporter
 Margaret Correro - general assignment news reporter
 Natalie Tavidian - general assignment news reporter
 Pete Demitriou - public safety news reporter
 Brian Ping - news anchor
 Mike Simpson - news anchor
 Charles Feldman - news analyst
 Elsa Ramon - news anchor
 Chris Seaton - news reporter

See also
KCBS-TV
KCBS-FM
CBS Columbia Square

References

External links

 
 FCC History cards for KNX (covering 1927–1980)
KNX Station History (earthsignals.com)
Recording of KNX's September 10, 1955 35th Anniversary broadcast (pastdaily.com)
Farewell broadcast from Columbia Square (August 4, 2006, linder.com)
KCBS-TV video, KNX Columbia Square sign-off
KNX tour, on the site of Chief Engineer Paul Sakrison (sakrison.com)

NX
All-news radio stations in the United States
Radio stations established in 1920
Radio stations licensed before 1923 and still broadcasting
1920 establishments in California
Audacy, Inc. radio stations
Clear-channel radio stations